The Sword of Roele is an adventure module for the 2nd edition of the Advanced Dungeons & Dragons fantasy role-playing game, published in 1996.

Plot summary
The Three Brother Mages, enemies of the creature known as the Chimera, claim to know the whereabouts of the famed Sword of Roele, and intend to obtain it.  Secretly they are after something else, but they send the player characters on a quest to the location of the sword to find and unearth what they are really looking for.  The Chimera also wants the adventurers to search for the sword, so she can discover what the Brothers are really trying to find.  The sword was supposed to have been deep and secure within the hoard of another creature, the Gorgon, but was placed where the Brothers sent the adventurers by a mischievous third party.  The adventurers arrive in this location, a tomb for paladins of the ancient Order of the Sun; the architect hired by the priests of the Order was actually a disguised necromancer who intended to use the tomb when he returned from the dead as a lich.

Publication history
The Sword of Roele was written by Wolfgang Baur, and published by TSR in 1996. Doug Stewart was the editor. Cover art was by Albert Slark, with interior art by Nick Choles.

Reception
Cliff Ramshaw reviewed The Sword of Roele for Arcane magazine, rating it a 4 out of 10 overall. He commented, "It’s a convoluted one, this." He noted that the designers added the plot twist of the necromancer to improve what would otherwise be a "pretty dull experience" of grave robbing a lawful-good tomb, but was also critical of this plot point: "Casting detect evil on the builder of the resting place for all their souls must have seemed like such a chore for the commissioning priests." Ramshaw concluded the review by stating, "It's not only convoluted, it's confusing and doesn't really hang together. Bit of a disappointment."

References

Birthright (campaign setting) adventures
Role-playing game supplements introduced in 1996